Bieganin  is a village in the administrative district of Gmina Raszków, within Ostrów Wielkopolski County, Greater Poland Voivodeship, in west-central Poland.

Notable residents 
 Walter Gorn (1898–1968), general

References

Bieganin